The 1st Destroyer Flotilla, also styled as the First Destroyer Flotilla, was a naval formation of the British Royal Navy from 1909  to 1940 and again from 1947 to 1951.

History

Pre-war history 

In May 1906, the First Destroyer Flotilla was attached to the Channel Fleet.  The flotilla was attached alongside the 2nd and 3rd Destroyer Flotillas. Between February and August of 1907, it was stationed in Portsmouth until being reassigned to the Channel Fleet. In February 1909 the flotilla was transferred to the 1st Division of the Home Fleet. On 27 July 1909, it was placed under the command of Commodore Edward F. B. Charlton until 1910. From May 1912 to July 1914 the flotilla was allocated to the First Fleet of the Home Fleet.

World War I 

At the outbreak of war in July, 1914, the First Destroyer Flotilla was part of the First Fleet and was composed of 20 destroyers, 1 depot ship, and 1 scout cruiser. In August 1914 it was grouped with two other flotillas to form the Harwich Force as part of the Grand Fleet, under the command of Reginald Tyrwhitt, until November 1916. The flotilla was next assigned to the Harwich Force where it remained until April 1917. From May 1917 until December 1918 it was in the Portsmouth Command. 

After World War One the flotilla was assigned to the Atlantic Fleet from November 1918 to April 1925. In 1925 it was re-designated 5th Destroyer Flotilla and assigned to its first overseas station as part of the Mediterranean Fleet until 1932. It was renamed back to the 1st Destroyer Flotilla still with the Med Fleet until August 1938. At the beginning of World War Two in September 1939, the flotilla was placed under the command of the Rear-Admiral, Destroyer Flotillas Mediterranean Fleet where it remained until July 1940 when it was moved to the Portsmouth Command, till May 1945. Post the Second World War the Flotilla was reformed again as part of the Mediterranean Fleet in July 1945 until October 1951 when it was renamed 1st Destroyer Squadron.

Command structure organizational changes took place within the Royal Navy during the post-war period. The term Flotilla was previously applied to a tactical unit until 1951 which led to the creation of three specific Flag Officers, Flotillas responsible for the Eastern, Home and Mediterranean fleets. The existing destroyer flotillas were re-organized now as administrative squadrons.

Operational deployments

Administration
In the Royal Navy, a Captain (D) afloat or Captain Destroyers afloat is an operational commander responsible for the command of destroyer flotilla or squadron.

Captains (D) afloat 1st Destroyer Flotilla
Incomplete list of post holders included:

References

Sources
 Halpern, Paul (2016). The Mediterranean Fleet, 1919–1929. Cambridge, England: Routledge. .
 Harley, Simon; Lovell, Tony. (2018) "First Destroyer Flotilla (Royal Navy) - The Dreadnought Project". www.dreadnoughtproject.org. Harley and Lovell.
 Watson, Dr Graham. (2015) Royal Navy Organisation and Ship Deployments 1900-1914". www.naval-history.net. G. Smith. 
 Watson, Dr Graham. (2015) "Royal Navy Organisation and Ship Deployment, Inter-War Years 1914-1918". www.naval-history.net. Gordon Smith.
 Watson, Dr Graham. (2015) "Royal Navy Organisation in World War 2, 1939-1945". www.naval-history.net. Gordon Smith.

Destroyer flotillas of the Royal Navy
Military units and formations established in 1907
Military units and formations disestablished in 1940